Dvicio, known as DVICIO or just DV, is a Spanish latin-pop group. DVICIO signed to Sony Music Spain.

History
Dvicio stated that during their childhood, the group were close friends who decided to form a group. The beginnings of Dvicio go back to 2009 when the present band members performed under the name Tiempo Límite, encouraged by the success of the popular band El Canto del Loco. As Tiempo Límite, they had minor hits with "Detrás de mis miedos" and "Dueña de mi mente".

2009–2012: Beginnings and forming Tiempo Limite 
While growing up in Madrid, Dvicio started their career as the group Tiempo Limite. Under this name, they released songs like "Duena de Mi Mente" and "Detras de Mis Miedos". In 2011, they took part in a music competition organized by ABC Punto Radio by sending their demo cover of the song "Titanium" and won the top prize.

2013–2014: Dvicio, Justo Ahora
In 2013 they changed their group name to Dvicio and after signing with Sony Music Spain, released their single "Paraiso" in 2014. The song, already popular on YouTube, gained more notice when employees of the fast food chain McDonald's in Spain performed the song in a flash mob video that went viral. McDonald's Spain went on to use "Paraiso" in a series of promotional ads, also releasing tutorial videos encouraging everybody to share in the dance. "Paraiso", recorded in Mexico, also became the first charting hit of the band.

2015-2016: Justo Ahora y Siempre, Tours and Latin Grammy's
Their second album, Justo Ahora y Siempre, was released in 2016, featuring the songs "Electricidad", "Paraiso" (English Version), "Enamórate" (English Version), and "Qué Mas Puedo Pedir" (Inédita 2015). "Nada" featuring Leslie Grace was also released around this time. In 2016, Dvicio went on small tour for their second album around Spain. There were also conformed artist that appeared at the Latin Grammys on September 9, 2016, alongside Jesse y Joy, Lucero, Lila Downs, Idina Menzel, and Aida Cuevas.

2017: Qué Tienes Tú and touring

On April 27, Dvicio released their third studio album, Qué Tienes Tú. It includes the songs "Idiota", "Casi Humanos" and "Quédate" (with Kany García). Dvicio toured the Spanish cities of Madrid, Bilbao, Barcelona. Dvicio are set to tour Mexico and South America. They were also special guest for the Portuguese group D.A.M.A in the concert in Madrid in the Teatro Barcelo, Lead member Andrés Ceballos has collaborated with them that they also got his band up their. Dvicio was on the cover of TVEO magazine in May 2017. Dvicio shared the stage with Mexican artist Mario Bautista at the Auditorio Nacional in México DF on May 27. Dvicio's single "Casi Humanos" stayed in the top 50 of the Spanish singles chart for 11 weeks, while the album entered at number 2 on the Spanish albums chart. Dvicio has also collaborated with Thailand artist Saksit Vejsupaporn also known as (ToR+ Saksit) on the song called "No Te Vas" which was released on Jun 6, 2017 through iTunes and is ranking 85 from Global Top 200's. On July 21, DVICIO released a single of a remix of the song "Casi Humanos" known as Casi Humanos Los Tailors Remix On July 24, DVICIO opened up a virtual store in Mexico. On December 4, 2017, DVICIO toured Mexico, Argentina and Chile.

2018: Touring, collaborating and DVCovers 
On February 8, 2018, Dvicio launched the DV Covers event, challenging fans to upload a video of themselves singing a DVICIO song under the hashtag #DVCOVERS. A winner was to be chosen and to receive an unspecified prize. On February 14, Dvicio was featured on a coverof "Enamórate" alongside Argentinean group Agapornis. On February 25, Dvicio announced that they would tour Peru for the first time, visiting Lima. On March 21, 2018, Dvicio announced the winner of the DVCovers competition as Nicole from Peru. On March 22, 2018, Dvicio hinted at a future collaboration with the group Reik if they accepted through Twitter. Dvicio also announced that they would visit the cities of Quito and Guayaquil in Ecuador on tour. On May 4, 2018 Dvicio, released their duet with the Mexican group Reik and also filmed its music video in Mexico. On September 27, Dvicio released a new single called "5 Sentidos" (featuring Taburete) as well with a music video the same day.

2019: Successful singles "Valeria", "Brasilera", "Palma con Palma" and touring 
On March 8, 2019, Dvicio released their single "Valeria" and an accompanying music video. On June 7, 2019, Dvicio released another single for the year with "Brasilera", with a video featuring Andrés Ceballos of the group as the protagonist and model Sasha Meneghel as the lead female protagonist. On July 25, 2019 Dvicio announced that their song "5 Sentidos" has become double platinum. On July 26, they released the single "Palma con Palma" with a music video, as well another set of tour dates for the Fall, while announcing that "Palma con Palma" would be used to close out the FIBA 2019 hosted in China.

2020 – present: Impulso 
Dvicio came out with their third new album Impulso on March 20. The album contained single songs "Valeria", "Dosis", and "5 Sentidos".

Members
Andrés Ceballos Sánchez - Is the Leader and Vocals, was born 
Martín Ceballos Sánchez - Bass Guitar, was born 
Nacho Gotor - Guitar, was born 
Alberto "Missis" González - Guitar, was born 
Luis Gonzalvo - Drums, was born

Discography

Albums

Compilation album

Singles

Featured songs

Other charted songs

Tours
These are tours for the albums Justo Ahora y Que Tienes Tu, so far they have gone to 5 countries and 16 cities in total. Dvicio has gone on small tour with in the ranges of 2015 and 2016. They have sold out the Teatro Metropólitan in Mexico for 3 times in a row since the start of their career. Mexico tour has updated dates for their upcoming tour for the country.

Justo Ahora Tour

Justo Ahora y Siempre Tour

Music Fest Events 
These are tours they were part of or open up as act for the artist. These 2 events Fiestas Ascensión 2015 and Coca-Cola Music Experience: On The Beach 2015 took place in Spain.

Casi Humanos Tour

Filmography

Music videos

Television appearances

Awards and nominations

Premios 40 Principales 
The Premios 40 Principales are music awards presented by the radio station Los 40 Principales. The awards are presented at a gala, with funds raised being donated to charities. The awards are presented based on a popular vote by music lovers in Spain.

Premios Dial 
The Premios Dial are winners who coincide the great advantage through radio española Cadena Dial from 1996 until the acts of the artist and groups in the native language of Spanish, from the year they have won in this award.

Latin Grammy 

During the year 2016 the group was nominated in the category of Best Large Music Video.

Premios Juventud 
Dvicio was nominated in 2016 for Producers Choice Award.

Notes

References

External links
Official website

Spanish boy bands
Sony Music Spain artists